The Balder Formation is a geological formation of lowermost Eocene in age, found in the Central and Northern North Sea and Faroe-Shetland Basin. The formation is named after Balder, a god from Norse mythology. Layers of tuff are found, particularly at the base of the unit, deposited by airfall from volcanoes associated with the North Atlantic Igneous Province.

References 

Geologic formations of the United Kingdom
Eocene Series of Europe
Ypresian Stage
Mudstone formations
Sandstone formations
Tuff formations
Eocene volcanism
Reservoir rock formations